S. A. Ravindranath (born 26 November 1946) is an Indian politician. Born in Shiramagondanahalli village of Davangere District, he represents the Bharatiya Janata Party (BJP) from Davangere North Constituency in the Karnataka Legislative Assembly. He is a senior Cabinet minister in the BJP government of Karnataka.

Career

A longtime member of the Bharatiya Janata Party, he has been elected to the Karnataka Legislative Assembly for four consecutive terms since 1994. He was elected as MLA from Mayakonda constituency for three consecutive terms and is currently representing  the Davanagere North constituency. He won the May 2008 Karnataka state elections with the highest margin of over 53,000 votes against his nearest rival. Earlier, he was the Minister for Sugar and Rural water supply in the BJP-Janata Dal (Secular) coalition government headed by H.D.Kumaraswamy. Following the historic victory of the BJP in Karnataka, he was sworn-in as a Cabinet minister in the Yeddyurappa government on 30 May 2008 and was entrusted with the Agriculture portfolio. Later he served as the Minister for Horticulture in the D. V. Sadananda Gowda ministry and Shettar ministry. He was also the minister in charge for Davanagere district at that time. He is credited with bringing the BJP to power in the Davanagere  City Corporation for the first time in 2007 with an overwhelming majority. However, the actual credit should go to Congress Leader Shamanur Mallikarjun whose papers were rejected at the last moment.

References

1946 births
Living people
Bharatiya Janata Party politicians from Karnataka
People from Davanagere
State cabinet ministers of Karnataka
Karnataka MLAs 1994–1999
Karnataka MLAs 1999–2004
Karnataka MLAs 2004–2007
Karnataka MLAs 2008–2013
Karnataka MLAs 2018–2023